Magland is a commune in the Haute-Savoie department in the Auvergne-Rhône-Alpes region in south-eastern France.

Geography 
Magland is in the Vallée de l'Arve, between Cluses and Sallanches. There are several hamlets like Gravin, Balme, Oëx and Luth. It is part of the canton of Sallanches.

Transport 
The commune has a railway station, on the La Roche-sur-Foron–Saint-Gervais-les-Bains-Le Fayet line.

Education 
There are four schools in Magland: the primary school of the Chef-Lieu, of the Gravin, of the Moranche and a nursery school.

See also
 Flaine
 Communes of the Haute-Savoie department

Twin towns
 Barzio, Italy

References

Communes of Haute-Savoie